Church Street Historic District is a national historic district located at Nassau in Rensselaer County, New York.  It consists of 36 contributing buildings located along Church Street.  They include a variety of residential and ecclesiastical building.  New England Federal style buildings predominate, with a number of notable Victorian period buildings, including a Second Empire residence dated to the 1870s.  Notable churches include St. Mary's Church (1925), Nassau Reformed Church (1901), and Grace United Methodist Church (1833).

It was listed on the National Register of Historic Places in 1978.

References

Historic districts on the National Register of Historic Places in New York (state)
Second Empire architecture in New York (state)
Federal architecture in New York (state)
Buildings and structures in Rensselaer County, New York
National Register of Historic Places in Rensselaer County, New York